The Augustusplatz is a square located at the east end of the city centre of Leipzig, borough Leipzig-Mitte. It is the city's largest square and one of the largest squares in Europe. It is also part of the city's inner-city ring-road and a central hub for its tram network.

History
The history of today's square began in 1785 (see also: Promenadenring) on a site within the city walls as the Platz vor dem Grimmaischen Tor to designs by the city architect Johann Carl Friedrich Dauthe. It was renamed Augustusplatz in 1839 after Frederick Augustus, the first king of Saxony. In 1928 the social-democratic city government renamed it Karl-Marx-Platz, though this name proved unpopular and was ignored even in newspaper articles and town plans. In 1933 the Nazis renamed it Augustusplatz, then in 1953 it became Karl-Marx-Platz again, and finally in 1990 (on the day of German reunification) it returned to its current name of Augustusplatz.

It is now dominated by the Opernhaus on its northern edge, the Neues Gewandhaus (with the Mendebrunnen) on southern side, and the main buildings of the University of Leipzig, including the City-Hochhaus Leipzig on the western side bordering the city centre. Destruction during the Second World War and the radical city-planning policies of the GDR both mean the Augustusplatz has lost its historical appearance: the previous main post office (Hauptpost), the newly built "Blu Radisson Hotel Leipzig" (former names: Hotel Mercure, Interhotel am Ring, Hotel Deutschland) and the university complex are all built mainly of concrete and steel in the style of the 1960s or later. In May 1968, for example, the bomb-damaged Augusteum and the university church that had suffered little damage (Paulinerkirche) were both dynamited. From 4 September 1989 to 1990, Monday demonstrations took place. From 1996 to 1998 an underground car park was built under the Augustusplatz with many entrances and ventilation shafts leading on to the square, the construction of which proved controversial. The carpark's eight illuminated glass cylinders housing the stairwells have been mocked in particular, being nicknamed "Milchtöpfe" or milk-bottles.

The construction of the university's new main building or Paulinum involved a fierce controversy over the possible reconstruction of the university church between 2002 and 2004.  Although completion of the complex was hoped for in 2009 for the university's 600th anniversary, the new Augusteum was completed not sooner than 2012. The new Paulinum recalls with its auditorium and the gabled roof the style of the former Augusteum and the demolished church. Its opening, which was also planned for 2009, was delayed until the beginning of December 2017. In the meantime, disputes about the future use of the new building on the site of the Paulinerkirche led to a blockage of the work, later there were complications with the completion of the glass columns for the interior of the building.

The main part of the university complex facing Augustusplatz was redesigned according to plans by the architect Erick van Egeraat.

Notable Buildings

Democracy bell 

On 9 October 2009, a public art object by the artist Via Lewandowsky, the Democracy Bell, was unveiled opposite the curve of the tram tracks at Grimmaische Straße. It commemorates the Monday demonstration on 9 October 1989. The bell rings every Monday at 6:35 p.m., which was around the time the demonstration began, also every 9 October at 10:30 a.m., and every day between 8 a.m. and 8 p.m. within each full hour randomly with one up to twelve beats. The bell is made of bronze and has the shape of an egg about three feet tall.

Tram interchange station 

Augustusplatz is also the name of a major interchange station in the Leipzig tram network of the Leipzig Transport Company. The interchange station is designed as a crossing stop, with two tracks running in a north–south direction on the inner city ring road (east side of Augustusplatz) and two more in an east–west direction on the middle lane on Augustusplatz (in the relation between Goethestraße and Grimmaischer Steinweg). If the middle lane is closed during events, tram traffic is guaranteed by the fact that the affected lines can turn from the stop on the inner city ring into Grimmaischer Steinweg via a connecting curve.

The trains of lines 8, 10, 11, 14, 16 and N10 stop at the tram stop at the eastern edge (before the crossing) and those of lines 4, 7, 12, 15 and N17  at the tram stop on the central lane. At both stops can stop two trains at the same time in each direction.

See also 
 List of high rise buildings in Leipzig

Literature 
 Thomas Topfstedt, Pit Lehmann (ed.): Der Leipziger Augustusplatz. Funktionen und Gestaltwandel eines Großstadtplatzes. Leipziger Universitätsverlag, Leipzig 1994, in German
 Wolfgang Hocquél, Leipzig. Architektur von der Romanik bis zur Gegenwart, Passage Verlag Leipzig 2004, in German
 Augustusplatz, in: Horst Riedel, Stadtlexikon. Leipzig von A bis Z, Pro Leipzig 2005, p. 29f, in German
 
 Annette Menting, Leipzig. Reclams Städteführer Architektur und Kunst, Reclam Verlag, Stuttgart 2015, in German
 Andrew Demshuk, Karl Marx Square. Cultural Barbarism and the People's State in 1968, Oxford University Press, Oxford / New York 2017, (E-Book)

References

External links 

 Augustusplatz at the web page of the city of Leipzig (in English)
 Pictures and description of the "Augustusplatz -  now and then" at the web page of Leipzig University 
 Augustusplatz in leipzig-lexikon.de 
About the Paulinum at the web page of the Leipzig university (in english)

Streets in Leipzig
Squares in Leipzig